The Princeton offense is an offensive basketball strategy which emphasizes constant motion, back-door cuts, picks on and off the ball, and disciplined teamwork. It was used and perfected at Princeton University by Pete Carril, though its roots may be traced back to Franklin “Cappy” Cappon, who coached Princeton in the late 1930s, and Bernard "Red" Sarachek, who coached at Yeshiva University from 1938 to 1977.

Concept
The offense is designed for a unit of five players who can each pass, shoot, and dribble at an above-average level. These players hope to isolate and exploit a mismatch using these skills. Positions become less important and on offense there is no point guard, shooting guard, small forward or power forward. However, there are certain rules that players running this offense are expected to follow.

The offense usually starts out with four players outside the three-point arc with one player at the top of the key. The ball is kept in constant motion through passing until either a player without the ball cuts toward the unoccupied area under and around the basket, and is passed the ball for a layup. The post player is a very important player in the offense. He sets up in the high post and draws attention to his positioning. When the ball is received in to the post the players main objective is to find back door cutters or defenders who have fallen asleep on the weak side. 

The hallmark of the offense is the backdoor pass, where a player on the wing suddenly moves in towards the basket, receives a bounce pass from a guard on the perimeter, and (if done correctly) finds himself with no defenders between him and a layup.  Alternatively, when the defensive team attempts to pack the paint to prevent backdoor cuts, the offense utilizes three point shots from the perimeter.  All five players in the offense—including the center—should be competent at making a three-point attempt, further spreading the floor, and not allowing the defense to leave any player unattended.

The offense is often a very slowly developing one, relying on a high number of passes, and is often used in college basketball by teams facing opponents with superior athletic talent in order to maintain a low-scoring game (believing that a high-scoring game would favor the athletically superior opponent). As a result, Princeton has led the nation in scoring defense 19 times including in every year from 1989 to 2000.

Use at Princeton
During his tenure as head coach of Princeton (1967–1996), Pete Carril compiled a 514–261 record, a .658 winning percentage. His teams won 13 Ivy League championships during his 29-year tenure with the Tigers, and received 11 NCAA Tournament bids and two National Invitation Tournament berths. Princeton captured the NIT title in 1975. Perhaps Carril's greatest win was his final upset victory on a backdoor cut to give Princeton the win 43 - 41 over the 1995 defending NCAA champion UCLA. The win extended Coach Carril's retirement by one game and is ranked as one of the best NCAA upsets of all time. Former Princeton coach Sydney Johnson and his predecessors Bill Carmody, John Thompson III, and Joe Scott have all employed the Princeton offense.

Other examples of use

National Basketball Association
After his retirement from Princeton in 1996, Pete Carril served as an assistant coach for the National Basketball Association's Sacramento Kings until 2006. During his time with Sacramento, Carril helped Rick Adelman, who became the Kings' head coach in 1998, implement the Princeton offense. Carril returned to the Kings during the 2008–2009 season as a consultant.

The Cleveland Cavaliers, Los Angeles Lakers, New Orleans Hornets, New Jersey Nets, and Washington Wizards also have run versions of the Princeton offense. in the National Basketball Association. Rick Adelman introduced a modified version of Pete Carril's system to the Houston Rockets during the 2007–2008 season. Coach Alvin Gentry also implemented an altered version of it that shows similarities to the triangle offense during the Phoenix Suns′s 2012–13 season. Eddie Jordan implemented the Princeton offense as coach of the Washington Wizards from 2003 to 2008) and of the Philadelphia 76ers from 2009 to 2010.

College basketball

NCAA Division I
Besides Princeton, some of the NCAA Division I  college basketball teams best known for using the offense are:

Air Force under Joe Scott, a former Carril player and protégé and former Princeton head coach
American under Mike Brennan, a former Princeton player and assistant coach
Brown under Craig Robinson, a former Princeton player and Northwestern assistant coach
University of Colorado, under head coach Jeff Bzdelik
Denver under former Princeton coach Joe Scott
Georgetown under John Thompson III, who played under Carril at Princeton and was later Princeton′s head coach
Holy Cross under Bill Carmody, another Carril protégé and a former Princeton head coach
Miami under Charlie Coles
North Dakota under Brian Jones
Pennsylvania under Steve Donahue, runs the "shuffle offense," loosely based on Princeton principles.
Notre Dame under Muffet McGraw 
Oregon State under Craig Robinson, a former Princeton player and Northwestern assistant coach
Richmond under Chris Mooney, a former Princeton player and assistant coach at Air Force
Samford under Jimmy Tillette
Southern California under Tim Floyd
Virginia under Tony Bennett, loosely based on the general principles of the Princeton offense
Wisconsin, under coach Bo Ryan, ran the "swing offense," which was loosely based on the Princeton offense
William & Mary under Tony Shaver

NCAA Division II
NCAA Division II colleges that have used the Princeton offense include:

Alabama-Huntsville under Lennie Acuff
Christian Brothers under Mike Nienaber
Rollins under Tom Klusman
Seattle Pacific under Jeff Hironaka

NCAA Division III
NCAA Division III colleges that have used the Princeton offense include:

Maryville under Kevin Carroll
St. Thomas, (St. Paul, Minnesota) under John Tauer
Nebraska Wesleyan University under Dale Wellman

NAIA
NAIA colleges that have used the Princeton offense include:
 Westmont under John Moore
NJCAA

NJCAA colleges that have used the Princeton offense include:

 Mercer County Community College under Howard Levy, a former Princeton player.
 Bergen Community College (Paramus, New Jersey)  under Will Caraballo.

High schools
High school basketball teams that have used the Princeton offense include:
 Northridge High School (Johnstown, OH) 2008-2012 under John Wheeler
 Oak Forest High School (Oak Forest, IL) 2008-2020 under Matt Manzke

Canada
Cardinal Leger Secondary School (Brampton, Ontario) under Steve Pettit
Sir Winston Churchill Secondary School (Vancouver, British Columbia) under Kevin Sandher
Mark R. Isfeld Secondary School  (Courtenay, B.C.) under Tom Elwood

United States
Arkansas Christian Academy (Bryant, Arkansas)under Ben Thomas
Benton Central Junior-Senior High School (Oxford, Indiana) under David Baxter
Christian Brothers Academy (Lincroft, New Jersey) under Ed Wicelinski
Gibson Southern High School (Fort Branch, Indiana) under Jerry O'Brien
Holy Cross High School (Delran, New Jersey) under Barry Harper
Indian Springs School (Indian Springs Village, Alabama) under Pete Arner
Lincoln County High School in West Hamlin, West Virginia, under Rodney Plumley
Memorial High School (Houston, Texas) under David Lay and under Jyusef Larry
Haverford School (Haverford, Pennsylvania) under Bernie Rogers
Lower Merion High School (Ardmore, Pennsylvania) under Greg Downer
Blair Academy (Blairstown, New Jersey) under Joe Mantegna

AAU, YBOA, and USBA

Amateur Athletic Union, Youth Basketball of America, and United States Basketball Association teams that have used the Princeton offense include:

43 Express Basketball (Georgia) under Chad Jackson, Sr.
KY Grind Basketball (Kentucky) under Lee DeForest

References

Footnotes

Sources

"Princeton Offense Keeps Hoyas on the Move", Washington Post, Mike Wise, March 23, 2006; Page E12.
"On the Offensive: Inside the Wizards "Princeton Offense"", WashingtonWizards.com, Dave Johnson, December 28, 2006
"Reading (the defense) is fundamental", Fran Fraschilla; ESPN.
DeForest, Lee: "Secrets of the Princeton Offense," Coach Princeton Basketball 
 "Hoyas arrive at Atlanta through back door" Randy Hill / Special to FOXSports.com, 3/28/2007
 "Race and the Georgetown Offense" by Sean Gregory for Time Magazine, March 29, 2007
"Carril Is Yoda to Notion of Perpetual Motion" New York Times, March 30, 2007

Basketball terminology
Princeton Tigers men's basketball
History of college basketball in the United States
Basketball strategy